Esposa último modelo is a 1950 Argentine film directed by Carlos Schlieper.

Cast
Mirtha Legrand as María Fernanda Alcántara
Ángel Magaña as Alfredo Villegas
Osvaldo Miranda as Lucas Alegre
Amalia Sánchez Ariño as Mercedes 'Yaya'
Felisa Mary as Abuela Carlota

References

External links
 

1950 films
1950s Spanish-language films
Argentine black-and-white films
Films directed by Carlos Schlieper
Argentine comedy films
1950 comedy films
1950s Argentine films